David Lawrence Angell (April 10, 1946 – September 11, 2001) was an American screenwriter and television producer. He won multiple Emmy Awards as the creator and executive producer of the sitcoms Wings and Frasier with Peter Casey and David Lee. Angell and his wife Lynn were killed heading home from their vacation on Cape Cod aboard American Airlines Flight 11, the first plane to hit the World Trade Center during the September 11 attacks.

Early life
Angell was born in Providence, Rhode Island, to Henry and Mae (née Cooney) Angell. He received a bachelor's degree in English literature from Providence College.  He married Lynn Edwards on August 14, 1971. Soon after Angell entered the U.S. Army upon graduation and served at the Pentagon until 1972. He then moved to Boston and worked as a methods analyst at an engineering company and later at an insurance firm in Rhode Island. His brother, the Most Rev. Kenneth Angell, was a Roman Catholic prelate and Bishop of Burlington, Vermont.

Career
Angell moved to Los Angeles in 1977. His first script was sold to the producers of the Annie Flynn series. Five years later, he sold his second script, for the sitcom Archie Bunker's Place. In 1983, he joined Cheers as a staff writer. In 1985, Angell joined forces with Peter Casey and David Lee as Cheers supervising producers/writers. The trio received 37 Emmy Award nominations and won 24 Emmy Awards, including the above-mentioned for Frasier. They also won an Outstanding Comedy Series Emmy for Cheers, in 1989, which Angell, Casey, Lee and the series' other producers shared, and an Outstanding Writing/Comedy Emmy for Cheers, which Angell received in 1984. After working together as producers on Cheers, Angell, Casey and Lee formed Grub Street Productions. In 1990, they created and executive-produced the comedy series Wings.

Death
Angell and his wife, Lynn were killed in the 2001 September 11 attacks at the World Trade Center in Manhattan. They were among the passengers of American Airlines Flight 11, who were all killed when that plane struck the North Tower of the complex. In a 1997 episode Angell cowrote for Frasier, a stranger leaves a telephone message for Frasier saying that she will soon arrive on "American Flight 11".

Legacy

The American Screenwriters Association awards the annual David Angell Humanitarian Award to any individual in the entertainment industry who contributes to global well-being through donations of time, expertise or other support to improve the human condition.

In 2004, The Angell Foundation of Los Angeles, California, awarded Providence College a gift of $2 million for the Smith Center for the Arts.

The two-part episode of Frasier to air after the attacks, "Don Juan in Hell" airing on September 25, 2001, ended with the memorial tribute, "In loving memory of our friends Lynn and David Angell". "Goodnight, Seattle", series finale that aired May 13, 2004, featured the birth of Niles Crane and Daphne Moon's son, who is named David in tribute.

At the National 9/11 Memorial, Angell and his wife are memorialized at the North Pool, on Panel N-1, along with other passengers from Flight 11.

References

External links

 
 

1946 births
2001 deaths
American Airlines Flight 11 victims
American male screenwriters
American television producers
American terrorism victims
People from Barrington, Rhode Island
Primetime Emmy Award winners
Providence College alumni
Showrunners
United States Army soldiers
Screenwriters from Rhode Island
American male television writers
20th-century American male writers
20th-century American screenwriters